Oscar Olou (born 16 November 1987) is a Beninese former professional footballer who played as a defensive midfielder. Between 2004 and 2013 he made 18 appearances for the Benin national team.

Club career
Born in Ouidah, Olou played club football in Ivory Coast, Benin, and France for Séwé Sports, Mogas 90, Rouen and Romorantin.

International career 
Olou made his international debut for Benin in 2004, and has appeared in FIFA World Cup qualifying matches.

References

1987 births
Living people
People from Ouidah
Beninese footballers
Association football midfielders
Benin international footballers
Séwé Sport de San-Pédro players
Mogas 90 FC players
FC Rouen players
SO Romorantin players
Championnat National 2 players
Beninese expatriate footballers
Beninese expatriate sportspeople in Ivory Coast
Expatriate footballers in Ivory Coast
Beninese expatriate sportspeople in France
Expatriate footballers in France